Chaetodon citrinellus is a species of butterflyfish (family Chaetodontidae). It is commonly known as the speckled butterflyfish or citron butterflyfish. It is found in the Indo-Pacific: the Red Sea, East Africa to the Hawaiian, Marquesan and Tuamotu islands, north to southern Japan and south to Australia.

It is a distinct species, most closely related to the fourspot butterflyfish (C. quadrimaculatus). Together they are basal in the subgenus Exornator, and might be intermediate between the core group of this subgenus and the species of the Rhombochaetodon (or Roaops) lineage. If that is correct, the latter would require to be merged into Exornator. If the genus Chaetodon is split up, Exornator might become a subgenus of Lepidochaetodon.

Description and ecology

As its names suggest, it is pale yellow with numerous small dark spots. There is also a black bar extending above and below the eye and a black margin to the anal fin.

C. citrinellus is common in shallow exposed reef flats, lagoons, and seaward reefs, generally in relatively open areas with scattered corals. They feed on small worms, small benthic invertebrates, coral polyps and filamentous algae.

Adults usually swim in pairs (pairs form during breeding), while juveniles are more often seen in small aggregations and commonly mix with other similar sized juveniles, especially of the Sunburst Butterflyfish (C. kleinii). They are oviparous.

References

External links
 

Chaetodon
Fish of the Red Sea
Fish of Hawaii
Fish described in 1831
Taxa named by Georges Cuvier